The Presidential Memorandum on Military Service by Transgender Individuals may refer to:
Presidential Memorandum on Military Service by Transgender Individuals (2017)
Presidential Memorandum on Military Service by Transgender Individuals (2018)